Gary A. Kowalski (born 1953) is an American author noted for his books on eco-spirituality, science, history, and animals.  He is the author of eight books including The Souls of Animals (New World Library) (1991), Science and the Search for God (Lantern Books), Goodbye Friend: Healing Wisdom For Anyone Who Has Ever Lost A Pet (New World Library), Blessings of the Animals: Celebrating Our Kinship With All Creation and The Bible According To Noah: Theology As If Animals Mattered, (Lantern Books), Earth Day (a children's book), and Green Mountain Spring and Other Leaps of Faith, both from Skinner House Books.

In his 2008 volume Revolutionary Spirits: The Enlightened Faith of America's Founding Fathers (BlueBridge Publishing), Kowalski sought to show that the Founding Fathers of the United States were neither devout Christians nor secularists but that their views combined religion with the new scientific and intellectual discoveries of the Enlightenment.

A graduate of Harvard College and the Harvard Divinity School, Kowalski was the senior minister of Burlington's First Unitarian Universalist Society for over 20 years. While there, he performed about 25 marriage ceremonies each year, including same-sex marriages because Kowalski said that the church should support all long-term, mutually committed relationships.  He also served on the Vermont State Advisory Panel to the United States Commission on Civil Rights.

In the summer of 2010 Kowalski left Burlington and moved to Santa Fe, New Mexico, to begin a 12-month interim ministry for the Unitarian Universalist congregation there.  In the following year he became interim minister at the First Parish Unitarian Universalist Church of Sudbury, Massachusetts and subsequently served parishes in Worcester, Massachusetts and Chapel Hill, North Carolina.  In retirement, he serves as a volunteer firefighter/emergency medical responder for Hondo Fire & Rescue in Santa Fe, New Mexico.

References

External links
Author's Website
Revolutionary Spirits - Weblog of Gary Kowalski
Gary Kowalski's artwork
Amazon.com Author Page for Gary Kowalski

Harvard Divinity School alumni
American male non-fiction writers
American religious writers
American spiritual writers
American Unitarian Universalists
1953 births
Living people
Harvard College alumni